Paul MacEwan (April 8, 1943 – May 2, 2017) was a politician in Cape Breton Island, Nova Scotia, Canada, and long-time member of the Nova Scotia House of Assembly (MLA).

Early life and education
He was the son of Horace Frederick MacEwan and was educated at the Sydney Academy, the Nova Scotia Teachers College, Saint Francis Xavier University, Mount Allison University, and Cape Breton University, from which he held a B.A. degree. He then worked as a teacher in Sydney.

Political career

As an NDP member
MacEwan was elected first as a candidate of the social democratic Nova Scotia New Democratic Party in the 1970 provincial election. He ran in Cape Breton Nova, a heavily blue collar riding (electoral district) that was home to the Sydney Steel plant and many coal miners.  During his first term as MLA, MacEwan wrote Miners and Steelworkers: Labour in Cape Breton, a history of union activities and political activism in the area, published in 1976. He was also the author of Confederation and the Maritimes which came out later in 1976, and The Akerman Years: Jeremy Akerman and the Nova Scotia NDP, 1965-1980, published in 1980.

MacEwan was closely associated with the work of Jeremy Akerman, who served as Leader of the Nova Scotia NDP from 1968 to 1980. Akerman had won the party leadership by four votes in 1968, at a convention at which MacEwan persuaded eight uncommitted youth delegates to support Alkerman. He and Akerman were the first two NDP MLAs elected in the history of Nova Scotia, in the provincial election of October 13, 1970, in which the PCs were defeated after 14 years in power, and replaced by the Liberals headed by Gerald Regan. During the years of Akerman and MacEwan, the NDP advanced by one seat in each election contested, and had four MLAs elected by 1978.

Expulsion from the NDP
In 1980, shortly after Akerman resigned from the Nova Scotia NDP leadership, the provincial executive expelled MacEwan from the party after he criticised party executive member Dennis Theman for having written an article advocating the reading of "Forward for the NDP and Socialism", a publication MacEwan considered Trotskyite.

Cape Breton Labour Party
After MacEwan left the NDP, he established the Cape Breton Labour Party, which presented itself as a rival political party to the others participating in the 1984 provincial election. The main issue separating the Labor Party from the NDP was freedom of speech, which MacEwan maintained the NDP no longer practised, as shown by the party's response to his criticism of Theman's reading recommendations. The party ran three candidates on the Nova Scotian mainland in addition to the eleven seats on Cape Breton Island.

MacEwan was the only one of the party's fourteen candidates to win election in the 1984 provincial election. The Labour Party was the fourth political party in Nova Scotian history to elect someone to the Legislature. Following the 1984 election, however, the party had to cease operations, due to lack of sufficient revenue to carry on its operations.

As an independent and a Liberal
MacEwan was re-elected as an independent in 1988. After this election, he contested, and won unanimously, the Liberal nomination in Cape Breton Nova, whereupon he was admitted to the Liberal caucus early in 1990. When the Liberals formed the government of Nova Scotia in 1993, he was unanimously elected Speaker of the House, and served in this role until late in 1996. He later served as Government House Leader, Chair of the Committee on Private and Local Bills, Deputy Government House Leader, and Caucus Whip. After the Liberals lost power in 1999, he continued to serve as their Deputy House Leader and Whip, and was critic for the Department of Labour and the Workers Compensation Board.

Declining health and retirement
MacEwan suffered two cerebral aneurisms in 2001 and 2002. He retired in 2003, having won nine elections in a row, and having served continuously for 33 years in the Nova Scotia Legislature, the longest record of continuous service ever provided by any MLA.

MacEwan was elected three times as a New Democrat: 1970, 1974, and 1978; then, in 1981, as an independent; in 1984, on the Labour Party ticket; in 1988, again as an independent; and in 1993, 1998, and 1999, as a Liberal. He obtained 80 per cent of the vote cast in 1993 and over 50 per cent in 1998 and in 1999. MacEwan's riding was often considered the safest riding in the province, no matter what banner he ran under.

MacEwan died on May 2, 2017.

Personal life
MacEwan was married to Carol Elizabeth Osborne and married Doreen Elizabeth Corbett in 1987.

References 

1943 births
2017 deaths
Nova Scotia Liberal Party MLAs
Nova Scotia New Democratic Party MLAs
People from Charlottetown
Speakers of the Nova Scotia House of Assembly
Nova Scotia Independent MLAs
21st-century Canadian politicians